Day Breaks is the sixth studio album by American singer-songwriter Norah Jones, released on October 7, 2016, through Blue Note Records. The album features nine original songs and three covers. Jones returned to a piano-driven sound as heard on releases early in her career. It peaked at number two on the US Billboard 200, becoming her sixth album to reach the top ten. Day Breaks received positive reviews from music critics, with many praising the album's production and Jones' vocals with many comparing it favorably to her debut album Come Away with Me. Jones promoted the album with television performances and interviews.

Release
Day Breaks was released on October 7, 2016, through Blue Note Records. At the time of its release it was made available on CD, vinyl and as a digital download. A limited edition orange vinyl was also released.

Writing and recording
Eight songs on the album are composed or co-written by Jones; composing on piano, she intended the album as a return to the sound of her 2002 debut, Come Away with Me. The album was co-produced by Jones and Eli Wolf and features drummer Brian Blade, organist Lonnie Smith and saxophonist Wayne Shorter. Jones explains the songs were composed by drawing on jazz music influences and were recorded live without any overdubbing.

There are three cover songs on Day Breaks: "Peace", by Horace Silver (first recorded by Jones in 2001), "Fleurette Africaine (African Flower)", by Duke Ellington and "Don't Be Denied", originally by Neil Young, whose lyrics were recast in the third person by Jones. The album also includes "Sleeping Wild" written by Sarah Oda, who co-wrote three other tracks on the album and co-produced.

The album was released on October 7, 2016, and the first single was the title song, "Day Breaks". Subsequent singles included the songs "Flipside" and "Tragedy".

Promotion
Jones performed songs from Day Breaks on The Tonight Show Starring Jimmy Fallon and The Today Show. She discussed the album on PBS's Tavis Smiley show on October 14, 2016. She also appeared on The Late Show with Stephen Colbert and performed her cover of Horace Silver's "Peace" from the album. To further promote the album, Jones embarked on Daybreaks World Tour.

Critical reception

Day Breaks received an average score of 77/100 from 10 reviews on Metacritic, indicating "generally favorable reviews." Stephen Thomas Erlewine of AllMusic rated the album four out of five stars and wrote that:  Glenn Gamboa of Newsday rated the album an "A", calling it Jones' "latest masterpiece." Rating the album an "A−", Entertainment Weeklys Jim Farber writes of Jones: "Not since her entrancing debut has she sounded this engaged."

Accolades

Commercial performance
Day Breaks debuted at number two on the US Billboard 200 (behind Green Day's Revolution Radio), moving 47,000 equivalent album units; it sold 44,000 copies in its first week, with the remainder of its unit total reflecting the album's streaming activity and track sales, marking her sixty top five album on the chart. It was a considerable drop from her previous efforts, Little Broken Hearts (2013) and The Fall (2009), which opened to sales of 110,000 and 180,000 units, respectively. The album debuted at number one on the US Jazz Albums chart, making it Jones' second album to reach number one.

Track listing
All tracks produced by Norah Jones and Eli Wolf, co-produced by Sarah Oda.

PersonnelMusicians Norah Jones – vocals and piano (all tracks), Hammond B3 organ and Wurlitzer electric piano (track 3), electric guitar (6)
 Peter Remm – Hammond B3 (1, 2, 6, 7), electric guitar (7)
 Tony Scherr – electric guitar (1, 6), background vocals (6)
 Wayne Shorter – sopranino saxophone (1, 8), soprano saxophone (7, 12)
 John Patitucci – double bass (1, 8, 12)
 Chris Thomas – bass guitar (2, 3, 7), double bass (4, 5, 10, 11), electric guitar (7)
 Brian Blade – drums (except 6, 9)
 Daniel Sadownick – percussion (2, 3)
 Lonnie Smith – Hammond B3 (3), background vocals (11)
 Jon Cowherd – Hammond B3 (11)
plus on tracks 5, 7 and 10
 Dan Iead – pedal steel guitar (7 only)
 Katie Kresek, Max Moston – violin
 Todd Low – viola
 Dave Eggar – cello, string arrangements
 Tony Maceli – bass
 Chuck Palmer – string arrangements, string conductor
 Phil Faconti – orchestration, copyistplus on tracks 6 and 9 Leon Michels – tenor saxophone
 Dave Guy – trumpet
 J. Walter Hawkes – trombone
 Vicente Archer – double bass
 Karriem Riggins – drums
 Sasha Dobson, Sarah Oda, Catherine Popper and Petter Ericson Stakee – background vocals (6 only)

On bonus tracks 13 and 16
 Norah Jones – vocals, piano
 Pete Remm – Hammond B-3 organ
 Jason Abraham Roberts – guitar
 Josh Lattanzi - bass, backing vocals
 Greg Wieczorek - drums, backing vocals
On bonus tracks 14, 15
 Norah Jones – vocals, piano
 Pete Remm – Hammond B-3 organ
 Chris Thomas - bass
 Brian Blade - drums
 Tarriona 'Tank' Ball and Anjelika 'Jelly' Joseph - backing vocalsTechnical'
 Norah Jones and Eli Wolf – producer
 Sarah Oda – co-producer
 Ted Tuthill – recording engineer (at Sear Sound Studios, NYC, additional recordings at Brooklyn Recording, Brooklyn, NY)
 Owen Mulholland – assistant engineer
 Tom Elmhirst – mixing (at Electric Lady Studios, NYC)
 Joe Visciano – mixing assistant
 Cameron Alexander, Brandon Bost, Jeff Citron, Adam Tilzer – studio assistants
 Greg Calbi – mastering (at Sterling Sound, NYC)
 Marcela Avelar – art direction
 Danny Clinch – photography

Charts

Weekly charts

Year-end charts

Certifications and sales

Release history

References

External links
 
 Article in Entertainment Weekly

Norah Jones albums
Blue Note Records albums
2016 albums